New World monkeys are all simian primates. While they are endemic to South and Central America, their ancestors rafted over or traversed via land bridge from Africa across the Atlantic Ocean when it was much narrower than at present.

Taxonomic classification 

 Infraorder Simiiformes
 Parvorder Platyrrhini - New World monkeys
 Family Callitrichidae: marmosets and tamarins
 Genus Saguinus: true tamarins
 Genus Leontocebus: saddle-back tamarins
 Genus Leontopithecus: lion tamarins
 Genus Callimico
 Genus Mico
 Genus Cebuella
 Genus Callithrix
 Family Cebidae: capuchins and squirrel monkeys
 Subfamily Cebinae
 Genus Cebus: gracile capuchins
 Genus Sapajus: robust capuchins
 Subfamily Saimiriinae
 Genus Saimiri: squirrel monkeys
 Family Aotidae: night or owl monkeys, also called douroucoulis
 Genus Aotus
 Family Pitheciidae: titis, sakis and uakaris
 Subfamily Callicebinae
 Genus Plecturocebus
 Genus Callicebus
 Genus Cheracebus
 Subfamily Pitheciinae
 Genus Cacajao
 Genus Chiropotes
 Genus Pithecia
 Family Atelidae: howler, spider and woolly monkeys
 Subfamily Alouattinae
 Genus Alouatta
 Subfamily Atelinae
 Genus Ateles
 Genus Brachyteles
 Genus Lagothrix

Key

Extant species

Family: Callitrichidae

Family: Cebidae

Subfamily: Cebinae

Subfamily: Saimiriinae

Family: Aotidae

Family Pitheciidae

Subfamily: Callicebinae

Subfamily: Pitheciidae

Family Atelidae

Subfamily: Alouattinae

Subfamily: Atelinae

See also 
 List of Old World monkey species
 List of Peruvian monkey species
 List of primates of Colombia

References

Notes

New World monkeys